The nineteenth season of the American animated television series The Simpsons originally aired on the Fox network between September 23, 2007, and May 18, 2008. It was the final complete season to be broadcast in 4:3 and in standard definition, although the first half of season 20 would also retain this standard.

Production
The nineteenth season of The Simpsons is the first one produced after the movie and contained seven hold-over episodes from season 18's JABF production line. Al Jean served as showrunner, a position he has held since the thirteenth season, while the season was produced by Gracie Films and 20th Century Fox Television.

Army Archerd reported that due to the 100-day Writers Guild of America strike only 22 episodes would be produced instead of the planned 23, which is much closer to the length of a regular season than most live-action and animated programs that were also affected by the strike. Entertainment Weekly also reported that, at the time, there were only six episodes remaining that were ready, which would make the season's production run consist of a total of 22 episodes.

The nineteenth season featured the returns of several characters from previous seasons. Kelsey Grammer made his tenth appearance as Sideshow Bob, and David Hyde Pierce made his second as Bob's brother Cecil Terwilliger in "Funeral for a Fiend". Beverly D'Angelo made her second appearance as Lurleen Lumpkin, who first appeared in season three's "Colonel Homer". Glenn Close returned as Grandma Mona Simpson for the third time.

Matt Groening described this season as "just about our most ambitious yet". The season's "The Homer of Seville" was nominated for a Writers Guild of America Award.

Reception

Critical reception
Robert Canning of IGN gave the series a 6.6 saying that it was "Passable" and that "Heck, read through the comments section at the bottom of our IGN Simpsons reviews and more than half will in some way be talking about the poor quality of recent episodes. (And "poor quality" is putting it politely.)" although he praised the late episodes of the season.

Awards
"Eternal Moonshine of the Simpson Mind" won a Primetime Emmy Award for Outstanding Animated Program, the tenth in the history of the show. Alf Clausen also received an Emmy Award nomination for Outstanding Music Composition For A Series (original Dramatic Score) for the episode "Treehouse of Horror XVIII".

Nielsen rating
The Simpsons ranked 83rd in the seasonal ratings getting a viewership of 7.950 million viewers and an 18–49 Nielsen Rating of 3.8 making it the highest-ranking show from "Animation Domination" right above Family Guy.

Episodes

Home media
On Saturday, July 20, 2019, it was announced by current showrunner Al Jean during the San Diego Comic-Con 2019 panel that the nineteenth season DVD would be released on Tuesday, December 3, 2019, in the United States and Canada by 20th Century Fox Home Entertainment, eleven years after it had completed broadcast on television. The Season 19 DVD includes 20 episodes and features “collectible Homer Simpson packaging,” Jean said. There are also custom menus on every disc, along with commentary on every episode, he added. It's the first DVD release of The Simpsons since The Walt Disney Company's acquisition of 21st Century Fox, the parent company of 20th Century Fox in March 2019. Frequent guest animator Bill Plympton designed the box art and menu animations, and is given special thanks for doing so in the booklet. As of 2022, it was the final season of the show to be released on DVD.

References

Notes

Bibliography

External links
 Season 19 at The Simpsons.com

Simpsons season 19
2007 American television seasons
2008 American television seasons